Carbon Balance and Management is a peer-reviewed open-access scientific journal published by BioMed Central. The journal covers research on the global carbon cycle. The journal was established in 2006 and is abstracted and indexed in PubMed, Agricola, CAB International, Chemical Abstracts Service, EMBASE, and Scopus.

References

External links 
 

BioMed Central academic journals
Carbon
English-language journals
Environmental science journals
Creative Commons Attribution-licensed journals
Publications established in 2006